This article lists the results and fixtures for the United Arab Emirates women's national football team.

2010

2011

2012

2015

2016

2017

2018

2019

2021

2022

See also
 United Arab Emirates women's national football team
 List of United Arab Emirates women's international footballers
 United Arab Emirates women's national under-20 football team
 United Arab Emirates women's national under-17 football team

External link
 

United Arab Emirates women's national football team